Charles Bruce may refer to:
 Charles Bruce, 3rd Earl of Ailesbury (1682–1747), British peer
 Charles Bruce, 5th Earl of Elgin (1732–1771)
 Charles Bruce (governor) (1836–1920), British colonial administrator
 Charles Bruce (physicist) (1902–1979), Scottish astrophysicist
 Charles Alexander Bruce (1793–1871), soldier, explorer and author
 Charles Andrew Bruce (1768–1810), Governor of Prince of Wales Island
 Charles Cumming-Bruce (1790–1875), Scottish politician
 Charles Edward Bruce (1876–1950), administrator in British India
 Charles Granville Bruce (1866–1939), British mountaineer
 Charles Morelle Bruce (1853–1938), American politician and businessman
 Charles "Nish" Bruce (1956–2002), British soldier and author
 Charles Tory Bruce (1906–1971), Canadian newspaperman and poet
 Charles Bruce, pseudonym of Fanny Crosby (1820–1915), English poet

See also
 Lord Charles Brudenell-Bruce
 Charles Brudenell-Bruce, 1st Marquess of Ailesbury (1773–1856), British peer and politician